Joseph Buck (born December 10, 2002) is an American soccer player who plays as a midfielder for Georgetown Hoyas.

Club career
Born in Arlington, Massachusetts, Buck began his career within the youth setup of local side Boston Bolts. In 2019, Buck joined the New England Revolution youth academy, playing for club's under-18/19 side. In May 2020, it was announced that Buck had committed to playing college soccer for the Georgetown Hoyas, joining the side in August 2021.

On May 12, 2021, Buck was called into the squad for the Revolution USL League One affiliate, New England Revolution II. He made his senior debut for the club that night, starting and playing 79 minutes as the Revolution II lost 0–1.

In the fall of 2021, Buck moved to play college soccer at Georgetown University.

Buck is eligible to play internationally for the United States, England, and Wales.

Career statistics

References

External links
 Profile at U.S. Soccer Development Academy

2002 births
Living people
People from Arlington, Massachusetts
Sportspeople from Middlesex County, Massachusetts
American soccer players
Association football midfielders
New England Revolution II players
USL League One players
Soccer players from Massachusetts
Georgetown Hoyas men's soccer players